Ilunda is an administrative ward in the Mkalama District of the Singida Region of Tanzania. According to the 2002 census, the ward has a total population of 19,465. According to the 2012 census, the population had increased to 21,622.

References

Wards of Singida Region